The men's double sculls competition at the 1976 Summer Olympics in Montreal took place from 18 to 25 July at the Olympic Reggatta Course at Île Notre-Dame.

Results

Heats
Three fastest rowers in each heat advanced to the semi-finals. The remaining rowers must compete in repechage for the remaining spots in semi-finals.

Heat 1

Heat 2

Heat 3

Repechage
Top three finishers in heat qualify to the semifinal round.

Repechage

Semifinals

Semifinal A/B
First three qualify to the Final A, remainder to Final B.

Semifinal 1

Semifinal 2

Finals

Final B

Final A

References

External links
  Official reports of the 1976 Summer Olympics

Men's double sculls
Men's events at the 1976 Summer Olympics